Timeline of events related to sexual orientation and medicine

19th century
1886
Dr. Richard Freiherr von Krafft-Ebing, a German psychiatrist, published a study of sexual perversity.

20th century
1948
Sexual Behavior in the Human Male, the first "Kinsey Report", was published by Dr. Alfred Kinsey.
1953
Sexual Behavior in the Human Female, the second "Kinsey Report", was published by Dr. Alfred Kinsey.
1957
The Society for the Scientific Study of Sexuality was founded to encourage the rigorous systematic study of sexuality.
1973
The American Psychiatric Association voted to remove homosexuality from the Diagnostic and Statistical Manual of Mental Disorders (DSM).
1975

 The Gay and Lesbian Health Caucus of the American Public Health Association is founded.

1977
The Bay Area Physicians for Human Rights was founded in San Francisco as a support group for gay and lesbian medical students, residents, and other health care providers. The group claims to be the first LGBT medical society in the US.
1981
The Gay and Lesbian Medical Association was founded in 1981 as the American Association of Physicians for Human Rights.
The first cases of gay related immunodeficiency, now known as AIDS, were first reported 5 June 1981, when the US Centers for Disease Control and Prevention recorded a cluster of Pneumocystis carinii pneumonia in five homosexual men in Los Angeles.
1987
The diagnosis of ego-dystonic homosexuality was dropped from the DSM.
1990
The World Health Organization replaced its categorization of homosexuality as a mental illness with the diagnosis of ego-dystonic sexual orientation.
1991
The American Psychoanalytic Association issued a statement allowing training of gay psychoanalysts.
1992 
The American Psychoanalytic Association prohibited discrimination against gay people when selecting teaching faculty.
1993
Dr. Dean Hamer published a paper suggesting a genetic component to sexual orientation.
1995
Saquinavir, the first protease inhibitor, was approved for public use by the FDA. HAART radically changes the prognosis of HIV/AIDS.
1996
The US Department of Defense included homosexuality in a list of "mental disorders", in a document known as "directive 1332.38: physical disability evaluation".

21st century
2002
The United States Department of Health and Human Services published Healthy People 2010, with the goals of increasing the quality and years of healthy life and eliminating health disparities in America. It identified sexual orientation as one of 6 demographic factors contributing to health disparities.

2004
New York Medical College revoked the charter of its LGBT medical student group after the applies to change its name from Student Help Organization to Lesbian, Gay, Bisexual & Transgender People in Medicine. School officials claimed “the organization and its leader would advocate and promote activities inconsistent with the values of NYMC.” In an interview with the Westchester Journal News, then AMA president Dr. John Nelson said that as a private institution the college has the right to set and enforce its own policies. The AMA organization did not support the ban, and the organization released a statement claiming the president's views were not representative of AMA policy.

The American Academy of Pediatrics published "Sexual orientation and adolescents", a report on the state of health of LGBT youth in the United States.

2005
American Medical Association president Edward Hill became the first AMA president to address the Gay and Lesbian Medical Association in a speech entitled "Understanding, Advocacy, Leadership: The AMA Perspective on LGBT Health."

2006
Touro University, a medical school in California, revoked the charter of its LGBT student organization. After an outcry of protest from various groups, the school restored the group and school officials apologized.
2007
The American Medical Student Association membership voted to create an action committee on LGBT health issues and elected Brian Hurley to the office of national vice-president, the first LGBT person to hold the office.
The US Food and Drug Administration re-affirmed its policy prohibiting men who have sex with men (MSM) from donating blood despite recommendations from the American Red Cross, and the American Association of Blood Banks.
James Holsinger was nominated by President George W. Bush to be US surgeon general.  Because of Holsinger's alleged support of the ex-gay movement, his nomination drew sharp criticism from groups like the Gay and Lesbian Medical Association and the Human Rights Campaign.
2013
The National Library of Medicine created the medical subject heading "Homophobia". The new medical topic was meant to catalog scientific reporting on "Differential treatment or unequal access to opportunities or services based on perceived homosexual preference or orientation."
2014
The American Medical Association elected its first LGBTQ officer, Dr. Jesse Ehrenfeld to its Board of Trustees
2019
The American Psychoanalytic Association apologized for having treated homosexuality as a mental illness.

See also

List of LGBT medical organizations
Homosexuality and psychology
 Homosexuality in DSM

References

External links
"The Lesbian and Gay Health Care Community and the AMA"

History of medicine
Sexual orientation and medicine
LGBT timelines
Sexual orientation-related lists